Whinyates is a surname. Notable people with the surname include: 

General Sir Edward Charles Whinyates (1782–1865), British Army artillery officer
General Francis Frankland Whinyates (1796–1887), British Army officer who served in India